Nnam is an Ekoid language of Nigeria.

References

External links
 Nnam basic lexicon at the Global Lexicostatistical Database

Ekoid languages
Languages of Nigeria